Come Out, Ye Black and Tans is an Irish rebel song referring to the Black and Tans, or "special reserve constables" (mainly former World War I army soldiers), recruited in Great Britain and sent to Ireland from 1920, to reinforce the Royal Irish Constabulary (RIC) during the Irish War of Independence. The song was written by Dominic Behan as a tribute to his Irish Republican Army (IRA) father Stephen, who had fought in the War of Independence, and is concerned with political divisions in working-class Dublin of the 1920s. The song uses the term "Black and Tans" in the pejorative sense against people living in Dublin, both Catholic and Protestant, who were pro-British. The most notable recording was in 1972 by the Irish traditional music group, The Wolfe Tones, which re-charted in 2020.

Authorship
The song is attributed to Irish songwriter Dominic Behan, who was born into the literary Behan family in Dublin in 1928 (his brother was Brendan Behan). The date when the song was written is not recorded, but Behan was active as a songwriter from 1958 onwards. The setting of the song is the Dublin into which Behan was born in the late 1920s, and the main character in the song (who is calling his neighbours "Black and Tans"), is believed to be Behan's father, Stephen Behan, who was a prominent Irish republican, and who had fought in the Irish War of Independence and the Irish Civil War. At times, the song's authorship has been mistakenly attributed to Stephen Behan.

Tune 
A variant of the tune migrated to Scotland and to the Appalachian Mountains, where it became the most common melody for the traditional folk ballad Barbara Allen.

Lyrics

While the song title and lyrics refer to the Black and Tans from the War of Independence, the song itself is a dispute between republican and unionist neighbours in inner-city Dublin in the Irish Free State era of the mid-1920s. During this era, Dublin continued to elect unionist pro-British politicians and voluntary service in the British Army was a popular career choice amongst working-class Dubliners, for both Catholics and Protestants. Supporting this tradition was the existence of a relatively large, and now generally forgotten and disappeared, Dublin Protestant working class. It is this pro-British working class, of both religions, that the composer is confronting in the song (a noted representation of this cultural group is Bessie Burgess in the Seán O'Casey play The Plough and the Stars).

In the chorus, the composer is pejoratively labelling his Dublin neighbours, who are pro-British and First World War veterans ("show your wife how you won medals down in Flanders"). He calls them "Black and Tans", and asks them to come out and "fight me like a man", stating that the "IRA" (Irish Republican Army), had made the Black and Tans "run like hell away" from rural Ireland such as the "green and lovely lanes of Killeshandra" (which is in County Cavan, and where, in 1922, ex-RIC and Black and Tan soldiers were forced to flee the town after being given a few days warning to leave by the local IRA).

The lyrics make references to the history of Irish nationalism, and "links the Irish experience with other peoples’ struggles against the British Empire, from the Zulus to the Middle East." One line of the song states to the Dublin neighbours: "Come tell us how you slew them poor Arabs two by two / Like the Zulus, they had spears and bows and arrows". The lyrics reference the disdain by his neighbours (saying "sneers and jeers that you loudly let us hear"), to the execution of the leaders of the 1916 Easter Rising, and to the fall of the Irish nationalist political leader, Charles Stewart Parnell.

There are variations of the original lyrics that incorporate references to more modern events in Irish nationalism, such as The Troubles.

Recordings

Wolfe Tones
The most notable recording of the song was by the Irish traditional group, The Wolfe Tones, who recorded the song on their 1972 album, Let the People Sing, and which credited the writing of the song to Joe Giltrap and Wes McGhee (who were traditional musicians but not band members), and an "unknown PD writer". The Wolfe Tones version of the song recharted in 2019–2020 (see below), and the group posted on their Twitter account that the proceeds from the re-charting would be donated to an Irish homeless charity run by Peter McVerry.

21st-century use

Celtic football club
In an article about the violence and bigotry surrounding Old Firm football matches, the Irish Independent wrote: "Then there's the stereotypical image of the Celtic supporters wearing T-shirts of 'undefeated army' and having their phones ringing to the sound of 'Come out ye black and tans'".

Advertising campaigns
In March 2019, Irish food company, Brady Family Ham, released an advertising video that went viral, which used the tune of the song but with amended lyrics, and replacing the word "Tan" with "Ham", that was directed by Father Ted director, Declan Lowney.

This Time with Alan Partridge (2019)
In March 2019, episode four of Steve Coogan’s This Time with Alan Partridge, ended with a rendition of Come Out, Ye Black and Tans by Coogan, acting in-character as the fictional Irish performer Martin Brennan (played as an eccentric rural Irish farmer). The Guardian reported that: "Irish Twitter went wild and the Wolfe Tones’ rendition of the song started to penetrate foreign consciousness on easily the biggest scale since Behan apparently put pen to paper". RTE News called it "the TV moment of the year".

RIC commemoration (2020)
In January 2020, The Wolfe Tones' version of "Come Out Ye Black and Tans" reached number 1 on the Ireland and UK iTunes charts, as part of "widespread criticism" of the (Irish) Government's planned commemoration of the RIC, as part of its "Decade of Commemoration" (commemorating the events of 19121922 in Ireland). As a result of this, on 10 January, the song entered the Irish Singles Chart at No. 33, and also debuted at No. 1 in the Scottish Singles Chart, which only counts paid-for sales and does not include streaming. The band committed to donating the proceeds of this recent success to a Dublin-based homeless charity.

2020 Irish general election

The song was used on occasions by Irish political party Sinn Féin, during the 2020 Irish general election, and was listed in the "10 defining moments" of the election by the Irish Independent. An adapted version of the song was also used by the Independent TD for Kerry, Michael Healy-Rae, as a campaign song.

Charts
The Wolfe Tones version

References

External links
 Come Out, Ye Black and Tans, the Wolfe Tones 1972 version
 Come Out, Ye Black and Tans, Lyrics.com

Irish songs
Irish rebel songs
Celtic F.C. songs
Number-one singles in Scotland
Songs used as jingles
1972 songs